Loop 168 is a state highway loop in the town of Tenaha in Shelby County, Texas.

Route description
The western terminus of Loop 168 is at  FM 947. The route travels to the east along Wall Street before ending at  Loop 157 one block north of that route's intersection with  US 59 / US 84.

However, Spur 200 has a certified length of only .

History
When originally designated on August 23, 1945, Loop 168 connected with  US 59 at both ends; the western terminus was at US 59 / US 84 one block further south, with the route turning along Main Street to an intersection with US 59, and the eastern terminus was at its present location, at the former alignment of US 59 through northeastern Tenaha. On December 12, 1950, the western end was moved to its current location, with FM 947, which was commissioned on November 23, 1948, being designated over that section of Main Street. On February 2, 1983, when US 59 was rerouted to the east, the old route through Tenaha along Center Street was actually designated as Loop 168, and the one-block route along Wall Street was designated as Spur 168. It is unclear as to whether this change was signed, as on May 29, 1985, old US 59 had its designation changed to Loop 157, and Loop 168 reverted to its previous routing.

Major intersections

References

168
Transportation in Shelby County, Texas